Nikolay Stanislavovich Gryazin (born 7 October 1997) is a Russian rally driver currently competing under a neutral flag representing the Russian Automobile Federation. He is the son of former rally driver Stanislav Gryazin and the younger brother of rally driver Vasiliy Gryazin. 

Gryazin has four overall victories in the European Rally Championship, and he finished second in the 2018 European Rally Championship, winning the ERC Junior U28 title. In 2019, he made his debut in the World Rally Championship, achieving his first WRC-2 class victory in the 2019 Rally Finland.

He currently competes for Toksport World Rally Team driving a Škoda Fabia Rally2 evo in the World Rally Championship-2, the premier support category of the World Rally Championship. His current co-driver is fellow Russian Konstantin Aleksandrov.

Background
A Russian driver with Latvian background, since the beginning of his rallying career, he has been a member of the junior rally program of Sports Racing Technologies.

Career

Early years
With their backing, he first rose to prominence in 2016, in the junior classes of the European Rally Championship, running a full-time campaign in the ERC-3 class with an R2-spec Peugeot 208. From the start he showed speed, but lacked enough consistency. After four rallies in which he failed to finish, he scored a class win at the Polish round in Rzeszowski and a podium at the Czech Rally Zlín. He finished the season placed 4th in the ERC-3 standings. He would also place 6th in the Latvian junior championship that year.

2017–2018: ERC & Latvia
In 2017, Gryazin would make the step-up to four-wheel drive machinery, as he would be using the Škoda Fabia R5 for a full-time outright campaign on the European and Latvian Rally Championships, along with select regional rallies across Europe. Gryazin struggled to take off in the European Championship, only managing a best finish of 5th at the Rallye Açores, until he fought Kalle Rovanperä to take an overall win at the season-ending Rally Liepaja, the Latvian round of the ERC. He finished the ERC season 7th place, and came second in the Under-28 trophy. Back in Latvia, he managed an impressive three victories and finished runner-up in the championship. Gryazin coupled these programs with podium finishes and victories in regional rallies at Estonia, Slovenia, and Finland.

The year of 2018 marked a breakout year for the young Russian. In addition to continued full-season efforts in the ERC and Latvia with the Fabia, Gryazin would also tackle the Finnish championship as well. This season would prove to be very successful for Gryazin, as he would take two overall victories in the ERC, one in Poland with a hard battle between himself and Jari Huttunen, and at Rally Liepaja for the second consecutive year. These victories were obtained on the way to a runner-up finish in the 2018 ERC standings, winning the Under-28 trophy as well. Gryazin finished 3rd in the Latvian championship with three victories, as well as taking home 4th in the Finnish Championship with one win. He took additional podiums and victories in regional rallies at Poland, Lithuania, Italy, Sweden, and Norway.

2019–present: World Rally Championship-2
After a big breakthrough year in 2018, it was announced that Nikolay Gryazin and Sports Racing Technologies would make the step up to a full-season campaign in the World Rally Championship-2 in 2019, which would mark his first starts in the World Rally Championship. After two victories in warm-up rallies in Norway, Gryazin made his WRC debut at Rally Sweden, and he would finish 15th overall, and 5th in the WRC-2 class. In his next round at Corsica, he finished 12th overall, and took a 2nd place WRC-2 finish, capitalizing on the attrition of the regular favorites. The rest of his 2019 season campaign is scheduled to be the remaining non-fly away events.

Rally results

Complete WRC results

* Season still in progress.

Complete WRC-2 results

* Season still in progress.

Complete European Rally Championship Results

Notes

References

External links

 Nikolay Gryazin eWRC driver profile
 Nikolay Gryazin's Facebook page
 Nikolay Gryazin's Twitter page

1997 births
European Rally Championship drivers
Living people
Russian rally drivers
World Rally Championship drivers
World Rallycross Championship drivers
Hyundai Motorsport drivers
Toksport WRT drivers